Shivaji Satam (born 21 April 1950), is an Indian television and film actor. He is best known for his role as ACP Pradyuman on the TV series C.I.D. on SET India. A former bank official and Inspection Officer, he has appeared in Hindi and Marathi films, including Vaastav, Ghulam-E-Mustafa, Yeshwant, China Gate, Taxi No. 9211, Nayak, Jis Desh Me Ganga Reheta Hai, Sooryavansham, Hu Tu Tu. In Marathi, he has received recognition through movies like Uttarayan.

Shivaji has been nominated for the Best Actors award for Star Screen Awards for Ghulam-E-Mustafa.

Later career

Shivaji made his screen debut in 1980 in the TV series Rishte-Naate. In 1988, he appeared in the series Famous Trials of India. He played a role in the Marathi show Ek Shunya Shunya. He then appeared in numerous serials and films, and became noted for appearing in the Hindi films Vaastav, Kurukshetra and 100 Days.

Filmography

Television

Awards and nominations
 2002 - Indian Telly Awards - Best Actor in a lead Role for CID as A.C.P. Pradyuman 
2002 - Maharashtra State Film Awards - Best Actor - for the film Ek Hoti Vadi 
 Maharashtra State Film Awards - Best Actor - for the play Dhyani Mani

References

External links

 http://www.nokiajeenaisikanaam.indiatimes.com/shivaji.html
 https://web.archive.org/web/20110102060724/http://www.tellychakkar.com/y2k6/apr/20apr/news_satam.php
 http://www.deccanherald.com/content/269222/policing-our-tv-screens.html

Indian male film actors
Male actors in Hindi cinema
Indian male television actors
Living people
20th-century Indian male actors
21st-century Indian male actors
Place of birth missing (living people)
1950 births